Bonjour Timothy is a 1995 Canadian-New Zealander romantic comedy film directed by Wayne Tourell and starring Dean O'Gorman, Stephen Papps and Sabine Karsenti.

Plot
Bonjour Timothy is a coming of age story of a young French-Canadian girl who goes on exchange to Auckland. The story follows Timothy, played by Dean O'Gorman, a young New Zealand boy who develops a crush on Michelle, played by Sabine Karsenti, the young French-Canadian girl from Montreal who is living with his family on her exchange. The story follows Timothy, a social underdog in his school, as he goes through a period of self-discovery, and tries to gain the attention of his crush, Michelle. This story depicts the trials and tribulations associated with being in high school, and the awkward stages that accompany being a young adult.

The New Zealand Film Commission describes Bonjour Timothy as, "In Bonjour Timothy (1995) the underdog wins the affection of the girl against all odds, in a film about coming-of-age anxieties over sex and love" (Aveyard, Moran & Veith 2018).

Buzzfeed described Bonjour Timothy as, "The Best Teen Movie You've Never Heard Of."

Cast
 Dean O'Gorman as Timothy Taylor
 Stephen Papps as Mr. Blisker
 Sabine Karsenti as Michelle Dubois
 Sylvia Rands as Mary
 Sydney Jackson as Roger
 Milan Borich as Nathan
 Angela Bloomfield as Vikki
 Richard Vette as Derek 
 Raewyn Blade as Ms. Brathwaite
 Nathaniel Lees as Mr. Wiley
 Jay Saussey as Melissa Anderson

Production
The film was shot largely at and around Avondale College in Auckland, New Zealand.

Film Crew:

 Director: Wayne Tourell
 Producers: Murray Newey, Micheline Charest
 Writer: David Preston
 Editor: Jean-Marie Drot
 Cinematography: Matt Bowkett
 Production Design: Brett Schwieters
 Composer: Daniel Scott
 Costumes: Pauline Bowkett

Awards
 1996 Berlin Film Festival; Kinderfilmfest, Children's Jury - Honourable Mention
 1995 New Zealand Film and Television Awards; Nominated for Best Director, Best Male in a Dramatic Role (Dean O'Gorman), Best Female in a Dramatic Role (Sylvia Rands) and Best Male Performance in a Supporting Role (Milan Borich) 
 1995 Cinemagic International Film and Television Festival for Young People (Northern Ireland); Best Feature Film 
 1995 Griffoni Film Festival (Italy); Critics Prize, Nominated for Best Actor (Dean O'Gorman)

References

External links
 
 Bonjour Timothy at The Film Archive
 NZ On Screen page

1995 films
DHX Media films
English-language Canadian films
New Zealand romantic comedy films
Canadian romantic comedy films
1995 romantic comedy films
1990s English-language films
1990s Canadian films